Neue Berliner Musikzeitung was a musical periodical that appeared in the years 1847–1896 and was published by Bote & Bock. It was a continuation of the Berlin musical newspaper published between 1844 and 1847 by Karl Gaillard.

History
The Neue Berliner Musikzeitung reported extensively on the musical life in Berlin, but also on other cities in Germany and Europe. And together with the Allgemeine Musikalische Zeitung and the Neue Zeitschrift für Musik, it was widely considered the most important and influential music periodical in Berlin as well as in the German states. In addition, it was the official publication of the Berlin Association of Musicians.
 
It was established by Gustave Bock, a former board member of the publisher, and Hermann Wolff (1845–1902), a former editorial director. Bock was the agent of Ferruccio Busoni and responsible for the founding of the Philharmonic Society.

Correspondents
Berlin: H. Bussler, L. Deppe, Heinrich Dorn, H. Ehrlich, Robert Eitper, Ferdinand Gumbert, W. Lackowitz, W. Langhans, O. Liebel, A. Löschhorn, H. Truhn, Heinrich Urban, Max Vogler, W. Westerhausen
Berlin-Charlottenburg: Otto Lessmann
Dresden: Emil Naumann
Cologne: August Guckeisen
Königsberg: Gustav Dullo, Louis Köhler
Leipzig: Johann Christian Lobe (1859–1867)
Milan: Martin Röder
Petersburg: W. v. Lenz
Potsdam: Mrs. Alberti
Röhrsdorf: Robert Musiol
Szczecin: Carl Kossmaly
St. Mauritz: Joseph Seiler

See also
Music of Germany

References

External links
Bote & Bock, GmbH on the International Music Score Library Project

1847 establishments in Prussia
Music magazines published in Germany
Music criticism
Magazines established in 1847
Magazines disestablished in 1896
Magazines published in Berlin
Defunct magazines published in Germany
German-language magazines